Sylvania is a suburb in southern Sydney, New South Wales, Australia,  south of the Sydney central business district in the Sutherland Shire. It is well known for its large waterfront properties and restaurants.

Sylvania is mostly residential but also contains areas of native bushland and some commercial developments on the Princes Highway and Port Hacking Road. Sylvania Heights is a locality in the western part of the suburb. Sylvania Waters and Kangaroo Point share the same postcode (2224).

History
The traditional owners of Sylvania are the Dharawal Aboriginal people and their archaeological heritage is evident in a number of registered middens, burial and art sites in rock shelters on the Georges River. After European settlement, this land was acquired by John Connell Laycock as a Crown grant. The name of the suburb relates to its original wooded vegetation. The word "Sylvania" comes from the Latin word sylvan or sylva which means "forest land".

The native vegetation of the suburb is now fast disappearing, as a result of increased development. Thomas Holt built Sutherland House on the foreshore of Gwawley Bay in 1818, on the eastern side of Sylvania. He established the Sutherland Estate Company in 1881 and a village grew here, with a post office opening in 1883. The school opened in 1884 but closed in 1891 and was not reopened until 1925. Sylvania Heights Public School opened in 1955.

'Sutherland House' no longer stands (only its gate posts survive), but there are a number of heritage-listed buildings in the suburb.  They include the original St Mark's timber church (now a Sylvania Public School class room) timber residence in Evelyn Street associated with the Holt Estate; 'Glenn Robin', built by William Glenn Wade on land he acquired in 1949 and completed in 1954; and 'Green Gables' built by Sidney and Clarisse Bayer between 1946 and 1952 on Kangaroo Point.*

In 1913, the  area bounded by Florida Street, Harrow Street, Mowbray Street and Illawarra Road (now the Princes Highway) was known as the Swastika Estate.

Much of the land of Sylvania Waters was 'reclaimed' from Gwawley Bay, effectively destroying the highly integrated mangrove flora of the bay. Sylvania Waters Estate was developed by L.J.Hooker in the 1960s; land offered had water frontages with boating facilities. Streets were named after Australian rivers to emphasise the association with water, such as Shoalhaven, Tweed, Murrumbidgee, Hawkesbury and Barwon.  The suburb has been identified as an area that is particularly vulnerable to inundation, should predictions of climate change, global warming and rising sea levels prove correct.

Commercial areas

Southgate Shopping Centre is located on the corner of the Princes Highway and Port Hacking Road. The shopping centre adjoins The Crest Hotel Sylvania and a McDonald's restaurant.

A small group of shops and restaurants is located on Princes Highway near the foot of Tom Uglys Bridge. Another group of shops known as Sylvania Heights Plaza is located further west along the Princes Highway at Sylvania Heights.

Transport
The Princes Highway crosses the Georges River over the Tom Uglys Bridge at Horse Rock Point and links Sylvania north to Blakehurst, in the St George area.  The suburb is serviced by buses operated by the Transdev NSW company.

Schools
 Sylvania Heights Public School
Sylvania High School
Sylvania Public School

Churches
Our Lady of the Way Catholic Church
St Michael's Orthodox Church
Sylvania Anglican Church
Sylvania Uniting Church

Demographics
According to the 2016 Australian Bureau of Statistics Census of Population, there were 10,479 people usually resident in Sylvania. 72.1% stated they were Australian-born. 2.8% were born in England, 3.4% in China (excluding Taiwan), 1.4% in New Zealand and 1.6% in Greece. English was stated as the only language spoken at home by 70.2% of residents and the most common other languages spoken were Greek 6.8%, Arabic 2.4% and Cantonese 2.3%. The most common responses for religion were Catholic 26.9%, Anglican 18.5%, No Religion 18.8%, Orthodox 12.9% and Uniting Church 4.1%.

Notable residents
Graham Annesley - former politician and rugby league referee
Myles Baldwin - horticulturalist
Brielle Davis - recording artist
 Jim Russell, cartoonist
Glenn Wheeler - media personality

References

Further reading

Audet, S. et al. Sylvania Back Then: Aspects of Local History, Sylvania High School, Sylvania, 1985.
Bursill, L., Jacobs, M., Lennis, D. Timbery-Beller, B., & Ryan, M. Dharawal: The Story of the Dharawal Speaking People of Southern Sydney, Privately Published, 2007?, 
Salt, D. F., Gateway to the South: An Intimate Insight into the Origins of the Sutherland Shire: First Stop—Sylvania!, privately published, 1987.

Suburbs of Sydney
Sutherland Shire